Ukrainian Uruguayans (Ukrajintsi Urugvaju) are an ethnic minority in Uruguay.

Ukrainians arrived in Uruguay around the 1920s, coming from Western Ukraine, Bukovina and the Zakarpattia Oblast, as well as some immigrants from Argentina. During the last years of the World War II, many displaced people came from Europe.

According to Ukrainian sources, nowadays there are several thousands of people of Ukrainian descent living in Uruguay. Other local sources report about only several hundred people of Ukrainian descent living in Uruguay, mainly in Salto Department; further, the 2011 Uruguayan census revealed 70 people who declared Ukraine as their country of birth.  A recent bilateral agreement aims at further research on Ukrainian roots in Uruguay.

Notable people
 Miguel Terekhov (1928–2012), ballet dancer and instructor
 Henry Engler Golovchenko (born 1946), neuroscientist
 Estela Golovchenko (born 1963), playwright, actress, and theater director
 Macarena Gelman (born 1976), activist and politician
 Daniel Fedorczuk (born 1976), FIFA football referee

References

External links
  

 
Uruguay
Ethnic groups in Uruguay
Immigration to Uruguay
European Uruguayan
Ukraine–Uruguay relations